Sessions '64 is a compilation album released for Record Store Day 2015 on April 18. It features productions by Brian Wilson and Jimmy Bowen for the artists the Honeys, the Castells, and the Timers. The album was issued as a limited edition 10-inch gold vinyl with only 1,500 copies pressed.

The set marks the first official release of the Honeys' instrumental "I Can See Right Through You" (also known as "Go Away Boy") recorded on February 17, 1964. Previously, a cover was recorded by Pearlfishers for the Beach Boys tribute album Caroline Now! (2000).

Track listing

References

2015 compilation albums
Albums produced by Brian Wilson
Capitol Records compilation albums
Compilation albums published posthumously
Record Store Day releases
Albums produced by Jimmy Bowen
Brian Wilson compilation albums